Zargari is a village in Hangu District, Pakistan.

In 2008, Pakistani military operations in the Pakistani tribal regions referred to Zargari as a conservative area and Taliban's stronghold.

Geography and climate
Zargari is located in the northwestern frontier of Pakistan in a mountainous region on the Iranian plateau right on the junction between the Hindu Kush mountains and the Eurasian plate, which leads to seismic activities. Halfway between Zargari and Naryab is the Naryab Dam, which is easily accessible via the Dam Road.

Zargari has a semi-arid climate, with very hot summers and mild winters. Winter starts in mid-November and ends in late-March, while summer's months are from late-May to September. Zargari is not in a monsoon region, however, moderate rainfalls occur in both seasons. During the winter rainfall shows a higher record between the months of February and April. The relative humidity varies from 46% in June to 76% in August.

References

Populated places in Hangu District, Pakistan